Brian Thomas Lowry (born 12 December 1936) is an English former professional footballer who played as a winger.

References

1936 births
Footballers from Manchester
English footballers
Association football wingers
Manchester United F.C. players
Grimsby Town F.C. players
Aldershot F.C. players
English Football League players
Living people